The 2021 Alabama Crimson Tide softball team was an American college softball team that represented the University of Alabama during the 2021 NCAA Division I softball season.  The Crimson Tide were led by Patrick Murphy in his twenty-second season, and played their home games at Rhoads Stadium. They competed in the Southeastern Conference, where they finished the season with a 52–9 record and an 18-6 conference record.

The Crimson Tide won the 2021 SEC Tournament, and qualified for the 2021 NCAA Division I softball tournament. They advanced to their 13th 2021 Women's College World Series, where they were eventually defeated by Florida State in the semifinals.

Roster

Schedule

|-
!colspan=9| Stinger Classic

|-
!colspan=9| 
|-

|-
!colspan=9| Easton Bama Bash

|-
!colspan=9| 

|-
!colspan=9| Easton Crimson Classic

|-
!colspan=9| 
|-

|-
!colspan=9| Easton T-Town Showdown
|-

|-
!colspan=9| 
|-

|-
!colspan=9| 2021 SEC softball tournament
|-

|-
!colspan=9|NCAA Tuscaloosa Regional
|-

|-
!colspan=9|NCAA Tuscaloosa Super Regional
|-

|-
!colspan=9|Women's College World Series
|-

Rankings

Awards and honors

References

Alabama
Alabama Crimson Tide softball seasons
Alabama softball
Alabama